Blessed Trinity Roman Catholic Church Buildings is a historic Romanesque revival Roman Catholic church complex located at Buffalo in Erie County, New York. It is part of the Diocese of Buffalo.

Description
The complex consists of the church, church-school building (constructed 1906–07), and parish house (constructed 1914). The church was constructed 1923-28 and is considered the purest replication of 12th century Lombard-Romanesque architecture in the United States.  The church is constructed of unmolded medieval style brick and may well contain the largest collection of colored architectural terracotta decoration in an ecclesiastical structure in this country.

It was listed on the National Register of Historic Places in 1979.

Gallery

References

External links

Blessed Trinity Roman Catholic Church, Buffalo's Faith Elevators website
Blessed Trinity Roman Catholic Church Buildings - U.S. National Register of Historic Places on Waymarking.com
"Houses of Worship: A Guide to the Religious Architecture of Buffalo, New York" By James Napora
Blessed Trinity RC Church photo - Karl R. Josker photos at pbase.com

Churches on the National Register of Historic Places in New York (state)
Historic American Buildings Survey in New York (state)
Romanesque Revival church buildings in New York (state)
Roman Catholic churches completed in 1928
20th-century Roman Catholic church buildings in the United States
Roman Catholic churches in New York (state)
Roman Catholic Diocese of Buffalo
Roman Catholic churches in Buffalo, New York
Polish-American culture in Buffalo, New York
National Register of Historic Places in Buffalo, New York